Stegnogramma burksiorum, synonym Thelypteris burksiorum, the Alabama maiden fern, is a fern species in the family Thelypteridaceae. It is closely related to Stegnogramma pilosa (syn. Thelypteris pilosa) and has been treated as the variety alabamensis of that species; the two have also been treated as a species complex. Stegnogramma burksiorum is native to Alabama in the United States.

References

Thelypteridaceae
Flora of Alabama